Kutumba ( Family) is a 2003 Kannada-language action film starring Upendra and Natanya Singh. The film was directed by Naganna and produced by Shailendra Babu. Music for the film was scored by Gurukiran. It is the first among a series of successful films under Upendra — Naganna combination. The film also starred Ashok, Gurukiran, Advani Lakshmi Devi, Shwetha in supporting roles and B.C. Patil and Sathya Raj played the negative roles. The film is a remake of the 1991 Telugu film Gang Leader starring Chiranjeevi. The success of the film led to the release of two other successful films under Upendra — Naganna combination, namely Gokarna in 2003 and Gowramma in 2005.

Cast
Upendra as Vijay
Natanya Singh as Kanyakumari
Ashok as Vivek
Gurukiran as Vidhyadhar
M. N. Lakshmi Devi
B. C. Patil as Shankar Patil
Arjun (Firoz Khan) as Jayaraj Patil 
Nithin Gopi as Sagar 
Dr. Nagesh kavati 
 Bank Suresh 
Shwetha as Menaka 
Sathyaraj as DCP Shekhar
Dalapathi dinesh 
Doddanna as Jailer 
Mysore Ramanand 
Mandeep Roy as House Broker
Pailwaan Venu 
Pushpa Swamy as Chief Minister 
Hanumanthe Gowda 
Vijaya Sarathi as Home Minister 
Myna Chandru as Astrologer 
Stunt Siddu 
Ravi varma 
Narasimha moorthi 
Jayalakshmi Patil as Lakshmi, Vivek's Wife 
Sridhar Raj as Sub-inspector A. B. Gowda

Box office
Kutumba ran for 50 days in more than 17 centres across Karnataka and recorded 100 days in many centres across the state like Bangalore, Mysore, Davanagere, Shimoga, Mangalore, Hubli. It also completed 125 days of run at its main center in Bangalore.

Soundtrack
The soundtrack album was released in Hubli in April 2003 by Police Commissioner of the city, K. V. Gagandeep, and Mayor, Prakash Kyarakatti. The music was composed by Gurukiran.

References

2003 films
Kannada remakes of Telugu films
2000s Kannada-language films
Films set in Bangalore
Films scored by Gurukiran
Films shot in Bangalore
Indian gangster films
Indian crime action films
2000s crime action films
Films directed by Naganna